The Act of Uniformity 1662 (14 Car 2 c 4) is an Act of the Parliament of England. (It was formerly cited as 13 & 14 Ch.2 c. 4, by reference to the regnal year when it was passed on 19 May 1662.) It prescribed the form of public prayers, administration of sacraments, and other rites of the Established Church of England, according to the rites and ceremonies prescribed in the 1662 Book of Common Prayer. Adherence to this was required in order to hold any office in government or the church, although the new version of the Book of Common Prayer prescribed by the Act was so new that most people had never even seen a copy. The Act also required that the Book of Common Prayer 'be truly and exactly Translated into the British or Welsh Tongue'. It also explicitly required episcopal ordination for all ministers, i.e. deacons, priests and bishops, which had to be reintroduced since the Puritans had abolished many features of the Church during the Civil War.

A few sections of this Act were still in force in the United Kingdom at the end of 2010.

Great Ejection

As an immediate result of this Act, over 2,000 clergymen refused to take the oath and were expelled from the Church of England in what became known as the Great Ejection of 1662.  Although there had already been ministers outside the established church, this created the concept of non-conformity, with a substantial section of English society excluded from public affairs for a century and a half.

Clarendon Code
The Act of Uniformity itself is one of four crucial pieces of legislation, known as the Clarendon Code, named after Edward Hyde, Earl of Clarendon, Charles II's Lord Chancellor. They are:

The Corporation Act (1661) - This first of the four statutes which made up the Clarendon Code required all municipal officials to take Anglican communion, and formally reject the Solemn League and Covenant of 1643. The effect of this act was to exclude nonconformists from public office. This legislation was rescinded in 1828.
The Act of Uniformity 1662 - This second statute made use of the Book of Common Prayer compulsory in religious service. Upwards of 2000 clergy refused to comply with this act, and were forced to resign their livings.
The Conventicle Act (1664) - This act forbade conventicles (a meeting for unauthorized worship) of more than 5 people who were not members of the same household. The purpose was to prevent dissenting religious groups from meeting.
The Five Mile Act (1665) - This final act of the Clarendon Code was aimed at Nonconformist ministers, who were forbidden from coming within five miles of incorporated towns or the place of their former livings. They were also forbidden to teach in schools. This act was not rescinded until 1812.

Combined with the Test Act, the Corporation Acts excluded all nonconformists from holding civil or military office, and prevented them from being awarded degrees by the universities of Cambridge and Oxford.

Another Act, the Quaker Act (1662), required subjects to swear an oath of allegiance to the king, which Quakers did not do out of religious conviction. It set out specific penalties for first (a fine of up to £5, or three months' imprisonment with hard labour), second (a fine of up to £10, or six months imprisonment with hard labour), and third (transportation) offence. It also allowed that should the defendant subsequently agree to swear oaths and not attend unlawful assemblies (as defined by the Act) then all penalties would be cancelled.

The Book of Common Prayer introduced by Charles II was substantially the same as Elizabeth's version of 1559, itself based on Thomas Cranmer's earlier version of 1552. Apart from minor changes this remains the official and permanent legal version of prayer authorised by Parliament and Church.

Act of Toleration

The Toleration Act 1688 allowed certain dissenters places and freedom to worship, provided they accept to subscribe to an oath.

Modified in 1872
The provisions of the Act of Uniformity 1662 were modified and partly revoked by the Act of Uniformity Amendment Act 1872.This has been repealed by the General Synod.

See also
Act of Uniformity
Conformist
Nonconformist
Puritan's Pit
Religion in the United Kingdom
Savoy Conference
Thomas Becket

Notes

References

Further reading

External links
Digital reproduction of the Original Act on the Parliamentary Archives catalogue
 Text of the Act
 Text of the Act, in Statutes of the Realm, vol. 5 at British History Online
 

1662 in Christianity
1662 in England
1662 in law
Acts of the Parliament of England concerning religion
Acts of the Parliament of England still in force
Christianity and law in the 17th century
History of the Church of England
Great Ejection
The Restoration